Ramana Maharshi (30 December 1879 – 14 April 1950) was an Indian Hindu sage and jivanmukta (liberated being). He was born Venkataraman Iyer, but is mostly known by the name Bhagavan Sri Ramana Maharshi.

He was born in Tiruchuli, Tamil Nadu, India. In 1895, an attraction to the sacred hill Arunachala and the 63 Nayanmars was aroused in him, and in 1896, at the age of 16, he had a "death-experience" where he became aware of a "current" or "force" (avesam) which he recognized as his true "I" or "self", and which he later identified with "the personal God, or Iswara", that is, Shiva. This resulted in a state that he later described as "the state of mind of Iswara or the jnani". Six weeks later he left his uncle's home in Madurai, and journeyed to the holy mountain Arunachala, in Tiruvannamalai, where he took on the role of a sannyasin (though not formally initiated), and remained for the rest of his life.

He attracted devotees that regarded him as an avatar of Shiva and came to him for darshan ("the sight of God"). In later years, an ashram grew up around him, where visitors received upadesa ("spiritual instruction") by sitting silently in his company asking questions. Since the 1930s his teachings have been popularized in the West.

Ramana Maharshi approved a number of paths and practices, but recommended self-enquiry as the principal means to remove ignorance and abide in self-awareness, together with bhakti (devotion) or surrender to the self.

Biography

Early years (1879–1895)

Ramana Maharshi was born Venkataraman Iyer on 30 December 1879 in the village Tiruchuzhi near Aruppukkottai, Virudhunagar District in Tamil Nadu, South India. He was the second of four children in an orthodox Hindu Brahmin family. His father was Sundaram Iyer (1848–1890), from the lineage of Parashara, and his mother was Azhagammal (1864–1922). He had two brothers Nagaswami (1877–1900) and Nagasundaram (1886–1953), along with a younger sister Alamelu (1887–1953). His father was a court pleader.

Both a paternal uncle of his father and his father's brother had become sannyasins. Venkataraman's family belonged to the Smarta denomination, and regularly worshiped Shiva, Vishnu, Ganesha, Surya and Shakti in their home.

When Venkataraman was seven he had his upanayana, the traditional initiation of the three upper varnas into Brahmanical learning and the knowledge of Self. He had a very good memory, and was able to recall information after hearing it once, an ability he used to memorize Tamil poems.

Narasimha notes that Venkataraman used to sleep very deeply, not waking from loud sounds, nor even when his body was beaten by others. When he was about twelve years old, he may have experienced spontaneous deep meditative states. Sri Ramana Vijayam, the Tamil biography that first appeared in the 1920s, describes a period a few years before the death-experience in Madurai:

When he was about eleven his father sent him to live with his paternal uncle Subbaiyar in Dindigul as he wanted his sons to be educated in the English language, so that they would be eligible to enter government service. Only Tamil was taught at the village school in Tiruchuzhi, which he attended for three years. In 1891, when his uncle was transferred to Madurai, Venkataraman and his elder brother Nagaswami moved with him. In Dindigul, Venkataraman attended a Hindu School where English was taught, and stayed there for a year.

His father, Sundaram Iyer, died suddenly on 18 February 1892. After his father's death, the family split up; Venkataraman and Nagaswami stayed with Subbaiyar in Madurai.

Adolescence and realization (1895–1896)

Venkataraman first attended Scott's Middle School and then the American Mission High School where he became acquainted with Christianity.

In November 1895 Venkataraman realized that Arunachala, the sacred mountain, was a real place. He had known of its existence from an early age, and was overwhelmed by the realisation that it really existed. During this time he also read Sekkizhar's Periyapuranam, a book that describes the lives of the 63 Nayanmars, which "made a great impression" on him, and revealed to him that "Divine Union" is possible. According to Osborne, a new current of awareness started to awaken during his visits to the Meenakshi Temple at Madurai, "a state of blissful consciousness transcending both the physical and mental plane and yet compatible with full use of the physical and mental faculties". But Ramana Maharshi later stated that he remained uninterested in religion or spirituality until his awakening eight months later.

According to Narasimha, in July 1896, at age 16, he had a sudden fear of death. He was struck by "a flash of excitement" or "heat", like some avesam, a "current" or "force" that seemed to possess him, while his body became rigid. A process of self-enquiry was initiated, asking himself, "what it is that dies?" He concluded the body dies, but this "current" or "force" remains alive, and recognized this "current" or "force" as his Self, which he later identified with "the personal God, or Iswara".

In one of his rare written comments on this process Ramana Maharshi wrote, "inquiring within Who is the seer? I saw the seer disappear leaving That alone which stands forever. No thought arose to say I saw. How then could the thought arise to say I did not see."

Later in life, he called his death experience akrama mukti, "sudden liberation", as opposed to the krama mukti, "gradual liberation" as in the Vedanta path of jnana yoga. It resulted in a state of mind which he later described as "the state of mind of Iswara or the jnani:"

After this event, he lost interest in school studies, friends, and relations. He was absent-minded at school, "imagining and expecting God would suddenly drop down from Heaven before me". Avoiding company, he preferred to sit alone, absorbed in concentration on this current or force, and went daily to the Meenakshi Temple, ecstatically devoted to the images of the 63 Nayanmars and of Nataraja, wanting "the same grace as was shown to those saints", praying that he "should have the same bhakti that they had" and "[weeping] that God should give me the same grace He gave to those saints".

Knowing his family would not permit him to become a sanyassin and leave home, Venkataraman slipped away, telling his brother he needed to attend a special class at school. Venkataraman boarded the train on 29 August 1896 and reached Tiruvannamalai on 1 September 1896 where he remained for the rest of his life.

Tiruvannamalai temples (1896–1899)

Arunachaleswara temple (1896–1897)
When Maharshi arrived in Tiruvannamalai, he went to the temple of Arunachaleswara. He spent the first few weeks in the thousand-pillared hall, then shifted to other spots in the temple, and eventually to the Patala-lingam vault so that he could remain undisturbed. There, he spent days absorbed in such deep samādhi that he was unaware of the bites of vermin and pests. Seshadri Swamigal, a local saint, discovered him in the underground vault and tried to protect him. After about six weeks in the Patala-lingam vault, he was carried out and cleaned up. For the next two months he stayed in the Subramanya Shrine, so unaware of his body and surroundings that food had to be placed in his mouth to keep him from starving.

Gurumurtam temple (1897–1898)
In February 1897, six months after his arrival at Tiruvannamalai, Ramana Maharshi moved to Gurumurtam, a temple about a mile away. Shortly after his arrival a sadhu named Palaniswami went to see him. Palaniswami's first darshan left him filled with peace and bliss, and from that time on he served Ramana Maharshi as his permanent attendant. Besides physical protection, Palaniswami would also beg for alms, cook and prepare meals for himself and Ramana Maharshi, and care for him as needed. In May 1898 Ramana Maharshi moved to a mango orchard next to Gurumurtam.

Osborne wrote that during this time Ramana Maharshi completely neglected his body. He also ignored the ants which bit him incessantly. Gradually, despite Ramana Maharshi's desire for privacy, he attracted attention from visitors who admired his silence and austerities, bringing offerings and singing praises. Eventually a bamboo fence was built to protect him.

While living at the Gurumurtam temple his family discovered his whereabouts. First, his uncle Nelliappa Iyer came and pleaded with him to return home, promising that the family would not disturb his ascetic life. Ramana Maharshi sat motionless, and eventually his uncle gave up.

In September 1898 Ramana Maharshi moved to the Shiva-temple at Pavalakkunru, one of the eastern spurs of Arunachala. He refused to return even though his mother begged him to.

Arunachala (1899–1922)

Soon after this, in February 1899, Ramana Maharshi left the foothills to live in Arunachala. He stayed briefly in Satguru Cave and Guhu Namasivaya Cave before taking up residence at Virupaksha Cave for the next 17 years, using Mango Tree cave during the summers, except for a six-month period at Pachaiamman Koil during the plague epidemic.

In 1902, a government official named Sivaprakasam Pillai, with writing slate in hand, visited the young Swami in the hope of obtaining answers to questions about "How to know one's true identity". The fourteen questions put to the young Swami and his answers were Ramana Maharshi's first teachings on Self-enquiry, the method for which he became widely known, and were eventually published as Nan Yar?, or in English, Who am I?.

Many visitors came to him and some became his devotees. Kavyakantha Sri Ganapati Sastri, a Vedic scholar of repute in his age, with a deep knowledge of the Srutis, Sastras, Tantras, Yoga, and Agama systems, but lacking the personal darshan of Shiva, came to visit Ramana Maharshi in 1907. After receiving upadesa from him on self-enquiry, he proclaimed him as Bhagavan Sri Ramana Maharshi. Ramana Maharshi was known by this name from then on. Ganapati Sastri passed on these instructions to his own students, but later in life confessed that he had never been able to achieve permanent Self-abidance. Nevertheless, he was highly valued by Ramana Maharshi and played an important role in his life.

In 1911 the first westerner, Frank Humphreys, then a police officer stationed in India, discovered Ramana Maharshi and wrote articles about him which were first published in The International Psychic Gazette in 1913.

In an appendix to Self realisation Narasimha wrote that in 1912, while in the company of disciples, Ramana Maharshi had an epileptic seizure, in which his vision was suddenly impaired three times by a "white bright curtain" which covered a part of his vision. At the third instance his vision was shut out completely, while his "head was swimming", and he felt his heart stop beating and his breathing seizing, while his skin turned blue, as if he was dead. This lasted for about ten or fifteen minutes, whereafter "a shock passed suddenly through the body", and his blood circulation and his respiration returned. In response to "strange accounts" about this event, he later said that it was a seizure, which he used to have occasionally, and did not bring on himself. According to Osborne, it "marked the final completion of Sri Bhagavan's return to full outer normality".

In 1916 his mother Alagammal and younger brother Nagasundaram joined Ramana Maharshi at Tiruvannamalai and followed him when he moved to the larger Skandashram Cave, where Bhagavan lived until the end of 1922. His mother took up the life of a sannyasin and Ramana Maharshi began to give her intense, personal instruction, while she took charge of the Ashram kitchen. Ramana Maharshi's younger brother, Nagasundaram, then became a sannyasi, assuming the name Niranjanananda, becoming known as Chinnaswami (the younger Swami).

During this period, Ramana Maharshi composed The Five Hymns to Arunachala, his magnum opus in devotional lyric poetry. The first hymn is Akshara Mana Malai. It was composed in Tamil in response to the request of a devotee for a song to be sung while wandering in the town for alms. The Marital Garland tells in glowing symbolism of the love and union between the human soul and God, expressing the attitude of the soul that still aspires.

Starting in 1920, his mother's health deteriorated. She died on 19 May 1922 while Ramana Maharshi sat beside her.

Sri Ramanasramam (1922–1950)

Commencement of Ramanasramam (1922–1930)
From 1922 until his death in 1950 Ramana Maharshi lived in Sri Ramanasramam, the ashram that developed around his mother's tomb. Ramana Maharshi often walked from Skandashram to his mother's tomb. In December 1922 he did not return to Skandashram, and settled at the base of the Hill, and Sri Ramanasramam started to develop. At first, there was only one hut at the samadhi, but in 1924 two huts, one opposite the samadhi and the other to the north, were erected. The so-called Old Hall was built in 1928. Ramana Maharshi lived there until 1949.

Sri Ramanasramam grew to include a library, hospital, post-office and many other facilities. Ramana Maharshi displayed a natural talent for planning building projects. Annamalai Swami gave detailed accounts of this in his reminiscences. Until 1938, Annamalai Swami was entrusted with the task of supervising the projects, and received his instructions from Ramana Maharshi directly.

Sri Ramana Maharshi led a modest and renunciate life. However, according to David Godman, who has written extensively about Ramana Maharshi, a popular image of him as a person who spent most of his time doing nothing except sitting silently in samadhi is highly inaccurate. From the period when an Ashram began to rise around him after his mother arrived, until his later years when his health failed, Ramana Maharshi was actually quite active in Ashram activities such as cooking and stitching leaf plates.

Discovery by westerners (1930–1940)
In 1931 a biography of Ramana Maharshi, Self Realisation: The Life and Teachings of Ramana Maharshi, written by B. V. Narasimha, was published. Ramana Maharshi then became relatively well known in and out of India after 1934 when Paul Brunton, having first visited Ramana Maharshi in January 1931, published the book A Search in Secret India. In this book he describes how he was compelled by the Paramacharya of Kanchi to meet Ramana Maharshi, his meeting with Ramana Maharshi, and the effect this meeting had on him. Brunton also describes how Ramana Maharshi's fame had spread, "so that pilgrims to the temple were often induced to go up the hill and see him before they returned home". Brunton calls Ramana Maharshi "one of the last of India's spiritual supermen", and describes his affection toward Ramana Maharshi:

While staying at Sri Ramanasramam, Brunton had an experience of a "sublimely all-embracing" awareness, a "Moment of Illumination". The book was a best-seller, and introduced Ramana Maharshi to a wider audience in the west. Resulting visitors included Paramahansa Yogananda, Somerset Maugham (whose 1944 novel The Razor's Edge models its spiritual guru after Ramana Maharshi), Mercedes de Acosta and Arthur Osborne, the last of whom was the first editor of Mountain Path in 1964, the magazine published by Ramanasramam.

Final years (1940–1950)

In November 1948, a tiny cancerous lump was found on Ramana Maharshi's arm and was removed in February 1949 by the ashram's doctor. Soon, another growth appeared, and another operation was performed by an eminent surgeon in March 1949 with radium applied. The doctor told Ramana Maharshi that a complete amputation of the arm to the shoulder was required to save his life, but he refused. Third and fourth operations were performed in August and December 1949, but only weakened him. Other systems of medicine were then tried; all proved fruitless and were stopped by the end of March when devotees gave up all hope. To devotees who begged him to cure himself for the sake of his followers, Ramana Maharshi is said to have replied, "Why are you so attached to this body? Let it go", and "Where can I go? I am here." By April 1950, Ramana Maharshi was too weak to go to the hall and visiting hours were limited. Visitors would file past the small room where he spent his last days to get one final glimpse. He died on 14 April 1950 at 8:47 p.m. At the same time a shooting star was seen, which impressed some of his devotees as a synchronicity.

Devotion

Ramana Maharshi was, and is, regarded by many as an outstanding enlightened being. He was considered to be a charismatic person, and attracted many devotees, some of whom saw him as an avatar and the embodiment of Shiva.

Darshan and prasad

Many devotees visited Ramana Maharshi for darshan, the sight of a holy person or God incarnate, which is advantageous and transmits merit. According to Flood, in Indian religions the guru is akin to the image or statue of a deity in the temple, and both possess power and a sacred energy. According to Osborne, Ramana Maharshi regarded giving darshan as "his task in life", and said that he had to be accessible to all who came. Even during his terminal illness at the end of his life, he demanded to be approachable for all who came for his darshan.

Objects being touched or used by him were highly valued by his devotees, "as they considered it to be prasad and that it passed on some of the power and blessing of the Guru to them". People also tried to touch his feet, which is also considered darshana. When one devotee asked if it would be possible to prostrate before Sri Ramana Maharshi and touch his feet, he replied:

In later life, the number of devotees and their devotion grew so large that Ramana Maharshi became restricted in his daily routine. Measures had to be taken to prevent people touching him. Several times Ramana Maharshi tried to escape from the ashram, to return to a life of solitude. Vasudeva reports: "Bhagavan sat on a rock and said with tears in his eyes that he would never again come to the Ashram and would go where he pleased and live in the forests or caves away from all men."

Ramana Maharshi did return to the ashram, but has also reported himself on attempts to leave the ashram:

Avatar
Some of Ramana Maharshi's devotees regarded him to be as Dakshinamurthy; as an avatar of Skanda, a divine form of Shiva popular in Tamil Nadu; as an incarnation of Jnana Sambandar, one of the sixty-three Nayanars; and as an incarnation of Kumārila Bhaṭṭa, the 8th century Mimamsa-philosopher. According to Krishna Bhikshu, one of his early biographers:

Indian devotees
A number of Ramana Maharshi's Indian devotees (a more extensive list of devotees can be found in V. Ganesan's Ramana Periya Puranam):
Ganapati Muni (1878–1936), Sanskrit scholar and poet, activist for Indian independence, and one of Ramana Maharshi's foremost devotees. Muni devised the name "Ramana Maharshi",
Gudipati Venkatachalam (1894 to 1976), a noted Telugu writer, lived the later part of his life and died near Ramana Maharshi's ashram in Arunachalam.
H. W. L. Poonja, a teacher of self-enquiry, who learned about it when he visited Ramana Maharshi in the 1940s
 Swami Ramdas visited Ramana Maharshi while on pilgrimage in 1922, and after darshan, spent the next 21 days meditating in solitude in a cave on Arunachala. Thereafter, he attained the direct realisation that "All was Rama, nothing but Rama."
 O. P. Ramaswamy Reddiyar, an Indian National Congress politician and freedom-fighter, who served as the Premier of Madras from 1947 to 1949.
 Sri Muruganar (1890-1973), "the shadow of Bhagavan", "is widely regarded as being one of the foremost devotees of Bhagavan." 
 Manavasi Ramaswami Iyer, who composed Saranagati, a popular Tamil devotional song to Ramana Maharshi.
Sri Sadhu Om, who compiled and edited Sri Muruganar's collection of songs into a multi-volume series, a task that took him about 18 years.

Western devotees
A list of Western devotees of Ramana Maharshi (not comprehensive):
 Paul Brunton's writings about Ramana Maharshi brought considerable attention to him in the West.
Arthur Osborne, the first editor of the ashram journal, The Mountain Path.
Maurice Frydman (a.k.a. Swami Bharatananda), a Polish-Jewish engineer and humanitarian who later translated Nisargadatta Maharaj's work I Am That from Marathi to English, was also deeply influenced by Ramana Maharshi's teachings. Many of the questions published in Maharshi's Gospel (1939) were put by Maurice, and they elicited detailed replies from the Maharshi. Maharshi's Gospel is the only English language text that was personally proofread by Ramana Maharshi - the original manuscript with corrections in Ramana Maharshi's handwriting still exits in the Ashram Archives.
 Ethel Merston, who wrote about Ramana Maharshi in her memoirs.
 Mouni Sadhu (Mieczyslaw Demetriusz Sudowski) (17 August 189724 December 1971), an Australian author of spiritual, mystical and esoteric subjects.
 David Godman, a former librarian at the ashram, who has written about Ramana Maharshi's teaching and the lives of Ramana Maharshi's lesser-known attendants and devotees.

Spiritual instruction

Ramana Maharshi provided upadeśa ("spiritual instruction") by providing darshan and sitting silently together with devotees and visitors, but also by answering the questions and concerns raised by those who sought him out. Many of these question-and-answer sessions have been transcribed and published by devotees, some of which have been edited by Ramana Maharshi himself. A few texts have been published which were written by Ramana Maharshi himself, or written down on his behalf and edited by him.

Ramana Maharshi also provided an example by his own devotion to Shiva, which has been extensively described by his devotees, such as walks around the holy hill Arunachala, in which devotees participated, and his hymns to Arunachala.

Self

Ramana Maharshi described his Self as a "force" or "current", which descended on him in his death-experience, and continued throughout his life:

Ramana Maharshi used various terms to denote this Self. The most frequently used terms were sat-chit-ananda, which translates into English as "truth-consciousness-bliss"; God, Brahman and Siva, and the Heart, which is not to be confused with the physical heart, or a particular point in space, but was rather to indicate that "the Self was the source from which all appearances manifested".

According to David Godman, the essence of Ramana Maharshi's teachings is that the "Self" or real "I" is a "non-personal, all-inclusive awareness":  

Ramana Maharshi considered the Self to be permanent and enduring, surviving physical death. "The sleep, dream and waking states are mere phenomena appearing on the Self," as is the "I"-thought. Our "true nature" is "simple Being, free from thoughts".

Ramana Maharshi would field many questions about jnanis ("liberated beings") from devotees, but even the terms jnani and ajnani (non-liberated being) are incorrect, since it leads one to the idea of there being a knower and a known, a subject and an object. The truth of it according to Ramana Maharshi is that there are neither jnanis nor ajnanis, there is simply jnana, which is Self:

Silence

Ramana Maharshi's main means of instruction to his devotees in order to remove ignorance and abide in Self-awareness was through silently sitting together with his visitors,  using words only sparingly. His method of instruction has been compared to Dakshinamurti – Shiva in the ascetic appearance of the Guru, who teaches through silence:

Commenting upon this silence Ramana Maharshi said:

Self-enquiry

Vichara, "Self-enquiry", also called ātma-vichār or jnana-vichara is the constant attention to the inner awareness of "I" or "I am". Ramana Maharshi frequently recommended it as the most efficient and direct way of realizing Self-awareness, in response to questions on self-liberation and the classic texts on Yoga and Vedanta.

According to Ramana Maharshi, the I-thought is the sense of individuality: "(Aham, aham) 'I-I' is the Self; (Aham idam) "I am this" or "I am that" is the ego." By paying attention to the 'I'-thought, inquiring where it comes from, the 'I'-thought will disappear and the "shining forth" (sphurana) of "I-I"{{refn|group=note|name="I-I"|"Nan-nan," literally "I-I", also translated as "I am, I am", "being-consciousness", and "I am I".<ref group=web>[http://happinessofbeing.blogspot.co.uk/2014/07/self-awareness-i-thought-i-feeling-and.html#02 Michael James, 2. நான் நான் (nāṉ nāṉ) means 'I am I', not 'I-I''']</ref> According to David Godman, the "I-I" is an intermediary realisation between the "I" (ego) and the Self. "[T]he verses on 'I-I' that Bhagavan wrote are open to two interpretations. They can be taken either to mean that the 'I-I' is experienced as a consequence of realisation or as a precursor to it. My own view, and I would stress that it is only a personal opinion, is that the evidence points to it being a precursor only.}}  or Self-awareness will appear. This results in an "effortless awareness of being", and by staying with it this "I-I" gradually destroys the vasanas "which cause the 'I'-thought to rise". When the vasanas disappear, the mind, vritti also comes to rest, since it centers around the 'I'-thought, and finally the 'I'-thought never rises again, which is Self-realization or liberation:

Robert Forman notes that Ramana Maharshi made a distinction between samadhi and sahaja samadhi. Samadhi is a contemplative state, which is temporary, while in sahaja samadhi a "silent state" is maintained while engaged in daily activities. Ramana Maharshi himself stated repeatedly that samadhi only suppresses the vāsanās, the karmic impressions, but does not destroy them. Only by abiding in Self-awareness will the vāsanās, which create the sense of a separate self, be destroyed, and sahaja samadhi be attained.

Bhakti

Although he advocated self-enquiry as the fastest means to realisation, he also recommended the path of bhakti and self-surrender (to one's deity or guru) either concurrently or as an adequate alternative, which would ultimately converge with the path of self-enquiry.

Surrender has to be complete and desireless, without any expectations of solutions or rewards, or even liberation. It is a willingness to accept whatever happens. Surrender is not the willful act of an individual self, but the growing awareness that there is no individual self to surrender. Practice is aimed at the removal of ignorance, not at the attainment of realisation.

Reincarnation
According to David Godman, Ramana Maharshi taught that the idea of reincarnation is based on wrong ideas about the individual self as being real. Ramana Maharshi would sometimes say that rebirth does exist, to step forward to those who were not able to fully grasp the non-reality of the individual self. But when this illusoriness is realised, there is no room any more for ideas about reincarnation. When the identification with the body stops, any notions about death and rebirth become inapplicable, since there is no birth or death within Self. Ramana Maharshi:

Background

Indian spirituality

According to Wehr, C. G. Jung noted that Ramana Maharshi is not to be regarded as an "isolated phenomenon", but as a token of Indian spirituality, "manifest in many forms in everyday Indian life". According to Zimmer and Jung, Ramana Maharshi's appearance as a mauni, a silent saint absorbed in samadhi, fitted into pre-existing Indian notions of holiness. They placed the Indian devotion toward Ramana Maharshi in this Indian context.

According to Alan Edwards, the popular image of Ramana Maharshi as a timeless saint also served the construction of an Indian identity as inner-oriented and spiritual, in opposition to the oppressive, outer-oriented, materialistic culture of the British colonial rulers:

Shaivism

Though Ramana Maharshi's answers explain and incorporate elements from Advaita Vedanta, his spiritual life is strongly associated with Shaivism. The Tamil compendium of devotional songs known as Tirumurai, along with the Vedas, the Shaiva Agamas and "Meykanda" or "Siddhanta" Shastras, form the scriptural canon of Tamil Shaiva Siddhanta. As a youth, prior to his awakening, Ramana Maharshi read the Periya Puranam, the stories of the 63 Tamil saints. In later life, he told those stories to his devotees:

Ramana Maharshi himself considered God, Guru and Self to be the manifestations of the same reality. Ramana Maharshi considered the Self to be his guru, in the form of the sacred mountain Arunachala, which is considered to be the manifestation of Shiva. Arunachala is one of the five main shaivite holy places in South India, which can be worshipped through the mantra "Om arunachala shivaya namah!" and by Pradakshina, walking around the mountain, a practice which was often performed by Ramana Maharshi. Asked about the special sanctity of Arunachala, Ramana Maharshi said that Arunachala is Shiva himself. In his later years, Ramana Maharshi said it was the spiritual power of Arunachala which had brought about his Self-realisation. He composed the Five Hymns to Arunachala as devotional song. On the three occasions Venkataraman (Ramana) referred to himself he used the name Arunachala Ramana. Ramana Maharshi also used to smear his forehead with holy ash, as a token of veneration.

In later life, Ramana Maharshi himself came to be regarded as Dakshinamurthy, an aspect of Shiva as a guru of all types of knowledge, and bestower of jnana. This aspect of Shiva is his personification as the supreme or the ultimate awareness, understanding and knowledge. This form represents Shiva in his aspect as a teacher of yoga, music, and wisdom, and giving exposition on the shastras.

Acquaintance with Hindu scriptures

During his lifetime, through contact with educated devotees like Ganapata Muni, Ramana Maharshi became acquainted with works on Shaivism and Advaita Vedanta, and used them to explain his insights:

Already in 1896, a few months after his arrival at Arunachala, Ramana Maharshi attracted his first disciple, Uddandi Nayinar, who recognised in him "the living embodiment of the Holy Scriptures". Uddandi was well-versed in classic texts on Yoga and Vedanta, and recited texts as the Yoga Vasistha and Kaivalya Navaneeta in Ramana Maharshi's presence.

In 1897 Ramana Maharshi was joined by Palaniswami, who became his attendant. Palaniswami studied books in Tamil on Vedanta, such as Kaivalya Navaneeta, Shankara's Vivekachudamani, and Yoga Vasistha. He had difficulties understanding Tamil. Ramana Maharshi read the books too, and explained them to Palaniswami.

As early as 1900, when Ramana Maharshi was 20 years old, he became acquainted with the teachings of the Hindu monk and Neo-Vedanta teacher Swami Vivekananda through Gambhiram Seshayya. Seshayya was interested in yoga techniques, and "used to bring his books and explain his difficulties". Ramana Maharshi answered on small scraps of paper, which were collected after his death in the late 1920s in a booklet called Vichara Sangraham, "Self-enquiry".

One of the works that Ramana Maharshi used to explain his insights was the Ribhu Gita, a song at the heart of the Shivarahasya Purana, one of the 'Shaiva Upapuranas' or ancillary Purana regarding Shiva and Shaivite worship. Another work used by him was the Dakshinamurthy Stotram, a text by Shankara. It is a hymn to Shiva, explaining Advaita Vedanta.

Ramana Maharshi gave his approval to a variety of paths and practices from various religions, with his own upadesa (instruction or guidance given to a disciple by his Guru) always pointing to the true Self of the devotees.

Advaita Vedanta

In contrast to classical Advaita Vedanta, Ramana Maharshi emphasized the personal experience of self-realization, instead of philosophical argumentation and the study of scripture. Ramana Maharshi's authority was based on his personal experience, from which he explained classic texts on Yoga and Vedanta, which he came acquainted with via his devotees. Arvind Sharma qualifies Ramana Maharshi as the chief exponent of experiential Advaita, to distinguish his approach from Shankara's classical doctrinal Advaita. Fort classifies him as a neo-Vedantin, because of the focus on self-inquiry instead of philosophical speculation. Ramana Maharshi himself did not call his insights advaita, but said that dvaita and advaita are relative terms, based on a sense of duality, while the Self or Being is all there is.

Although Ramana Maharshi's teaching is consistent with and generally associated with Hinduism, the Upanishads and Advaita Vedanta, there are differences with the traditional Advaitic school. Advaita recommends a negationist neti, neti (Sanskrit, "not this", "not this") path, or mental affirmations that the Self is the only reality, such as "I am Brahman" or "I am He", while Ramana Maharshi advocated Self-enquiry Nan Yar. In contrast with traditional Advaita Vedanta, Ramana Maharshi strongly discouraged devotees from adopting a renunciate lifestyle and renouncing their responsibilities. To one devotee who felt he should abandon his family, whom he described as "samsara" ("illusion"), to intensify his spiritual practice, Sri Ramana Maharshi replied:

The scholar of religion Lola Williamson has described Indian gurus such as Ramana Maharshi, Meher Baba, Sri Aurobindo and Swami Satchidananda Saraswati as having developed "Hindu-Inspired Meditation Movements", also called neo-Vedanta and modernist Hinduism.

Legacy

Although many claim to be influenced by him, Ramana Maharshi did not publicise himself as a guru, never claimed to have disciples, and never appointed any successors.arunachala-ramana.org, Bhagavan Sri Ramana Maharshi – Great Sage or Milch cow? While a few who came to see him are said to have become enlightened through association, he did not publicly acknowledge any living person as liberated other than his mother at death. Ramana Maharshi never promoted any lineage.

With regard to the Sri Ramana Ashram, in 1938 Maharshi made a legal will bequeathing all the Ramanashram properties to his younger brother Niranjanananda and his descendants. In 2013, Ramanashram is run by Sri Niranjananda's grandson Sri V.S. Raman. Ramanashram is legally recognised as a public religious trust whose aim is to maintain it in a way that is consistent with Sri Ramana Maharshi's declared wishes. The ashram should remain open as a spiritual institution so that anyone who wishes to can avail themselves of its facilities.

In the 1930s, Maharshi's teachings were brought to the west by Paul Brunton in his A Search in Secret India. Stimulated by Arthur Osborne, in the 1960s Bhagawat Singh actively started to spread Ramana Maharshi's teachings in the US. Ramana Maharshi has been further popularised in the west by the neo-Advaita movement, via the students of H. W. L. Poonja; this movement gives a western re-interpretation of his teachings by placing sole emphasis on insight alone. It has been criticised for this emphasis, omitting the preparatory practices. Nevertheless, Neo-Advaita has become an important constituent of popular western spirituality.

The scholar Philip Goldberg has listed Western religious thinkers influenced by Ramana Maharshi as including Francis X. Clooney, Georg Feuerstein, Bede Griffiths, Andrew Harvey, Thomas Merton, Henri Le Saux (Swami Abhishiktananada), Eckhart Tolle, and Ken Wilber.

Works
Writings
According to Ebert, Ramana Maharshi "never felt moved to formulate his teaching of his own accord, either verbally or in writing". The few writings he is credited with "came into being as answers to questions asked by his disciples or through their urging". Only a few hymns were written on his own initiative. Writings by Ramana Maharshi are:
 Gambhiram Sheshayya, Vichāra Sangraham, "Self-Enquiry". Answers to questions, compiled in 1901, published in dialogue-form, republished as essay in 1939 as A Catechism of Enquiry. Also published in 1944 in Heinrich Zimmer's Der Weg zum Selbst.
 Sivaprakasam Pillai, Nān Yār?, "Who am I?". Answers to questions, compiled in 1902, first published in 1923.
 Five Hymns to Arunachala:
 Akshara Mana Malai, "The Marital Garland of Letters". In 1914, at the request of a devotee, Ramana Maharshi wrote Akshara Mana Malai for his devotees to sing while on their rounds for alms. It's a hymn in praise of Shiva, manifest as the mountain Arunachala. The hymn consists of 108 stanzas composed in poetic Tamil.
 Navamani Mālai, "The Necklet of Nine Gems".
 Arunāchala Patikam, "Eleven Verses to Sri Arunachala".
 Arunāchala Ashtakam, "Eight Stanzas to Sri Arunachala".
 Arunāchala Pañcharatna, "Five Stanzas to Sri Arunachala".
 Sri Muruganar and Sri Ramana Maharshi, Upadesha Sāra (Upadesha Undiyar), "The Essence of Instruction". In 1927 Muruganar started a poem on the Gods, but asked Ramana Maharshi to write thirty verses on upadesha, "teaching" or "instruction".
 Ramana Maharshi, Ulladu narpadu, "Forty Verses on Reality". Written in 1928. First English translation and commentary by S.S. Cohen in 1931.
 Ullada Nārpadu Anubandham, "Reality in Forty Verses: Supplement". Forty stanzas, fifteen of which are being written by Ramana Maharshi. The other twenty-five are translations of various Sanskrit-texts.
 Sri Muruganar and Sri Ramana Maharshi (1930s), Ramana Puranam.
 Ekātma Pañchakam, "Five Verses on the Self". Written in 1947, at the request of a female devotee.

All these texts are collected in the Collected Works.
In addition to original works, Ramana Maharshi has also translated some scriptures for the benefit of devotees. He selected, rearranged and translated 42 verses from the Bhagavad Gita into Tamil and Malayalam. He has also translated few works such as Dakshinamurti Stotra, Vivekachudamani and Dṛg-Dṛśya-Viveka attributed to Shankarachaya.

Recorded talks
Several collections of recorded talks, in which Sri Ramana Maharshi used Tamil, Telugu and Malayalam, have been published. Those are based on written transcripts, which were "hurriedly written down in English by his official interpreters".
 Sri Natanananda, Upadesa Manjari, "Origin of Spiritual Instruction". Recordings of dialogues between Sri Ramana Maharshi and devotees. First published in English in 1939 as A Catechism of Instruction.
 Munagala Venkatramaiah, Talks with Sri Ramana. Talks recorded between 1935 and 1939. Various editions:
 Print: 
 Online:  
 
 
  Talks recorded between 1945 and 1947.
 

 Reminiscences 
Frank Humphreys, a British policeman stationed in India, visited Ramana Maharshi in 1911 and wrote articles about him which were first published in The International Psychic Gazette in 1913.
 Paul Brunton (1935), A Search in Secret India. This book introduced Ramana Maharshi to a western audience.
  First published 1956.
 
 
 Kunjuswami, Living with the Master. Recordings of Kunjuswami's experiences with Ramana Maharshi from 1920 on. 
 G. V. Subbaramayya, Sri Ramana Reminiscences. "The account covers the years between 1933 and 1950".

Documentaries
A Day in the Life at Ramana Maharshi Ashram
The Sage of Arunachala
Abide as the Self: The Essential Teachings of Ramana Maharshi
Talks on Sri Ramana Maharshi: Narrated by David Godman
Who is Sri Ramana... Who am I?
The Eternal Light
Sri Ramana Maharshi - JNANI
Arunachala Shiva - Teachings of Ramana Maharshi

See also

 Shaiva Siddhanta
 Brahman
 Spiritual crisis
Nisargadatta Maharaj
Advaita Vedanta
Self-enquiry

Notes

References

Sources
Printed sources

 
 
 
 
 
 
 
 
 
 
 
 
 
 
 
 
 
 
 
 
 
 
 
 
 
 
 
 
 
 
 
 
 
 
 
 
 
 
 
 
 
 
 
 
 
 
 
 
 
 
 
 
 
 
 
 
 Visvanathan, Susan (2010), The Children of Nature: The Life and Legacy of Ramana Maharshi. New Delhi: Roli/Lotus
 
 
 

Web-sources

Translations of Indian texts

Further reading
Upadesa (spiritual instructions)
 Muranagala Venkataramiah (2006), Talks With Sri Ramana Maharshi, Sri Ramanasramam; records of upadesa, instructions and answers by Ramana Maharshi in response to visitors
 

Biography
 
 
 

Background
 
 David Godman, Paul Brunton's Background, a critique of Friesen's analysis
 

Neurological approaches
 G.K. Pillai (2015), Monks are from Meditating Monkeys: Unravelling the Algorithm of True Spiritual Awakening''

External links

 Ramana Maharshi Ashram: A Poetic Visual Tour
 
 
 Ramana Maharshi Rare video footage
 Sri Ramana Maharshi: Home
 Cosmic Harmony – Biography of Ramana Maharshi
 Realization.org – Biography of Ramana Maharshi

1879 births
1950 deaths
Hindu new religious movements
20th-century Hindu religious leaders
Advaitin philosophers
Indian Hindu spiritual teachers
Indian Hindu monks
20th-century Indian philosophers
Neo-Advaita teachers
People considered avatars by their followers
People from Virudhunagar district
Neo-Vedanta
Hindu revivalists
Tamil Hindu saints
Deaths from cancer in India